Kosmos 8 ( meaning Cosmos 8), also known as DS-K-8 No.1 and occasionally in the West as Sputnik 18 was a technology demonstration satellite which was launched by the Soviet Union in 1962. It was the eighth satellite to be designated under the Kosmos system, and the third spacecraft launched as part of the DS programme to successfully reach orbit, after Kosmos 1 and Kosmos 6. Its primary mission was to demonstrate the technologies of SIGINT for future Soviet military satellites.

Spacecraft
Kosmos 8 was the only DS-K-8 satellite to be launched. It also carried a micrometeorite detector payload which discovered meteoroid flux.

Mission
This satellite tested the Kust-8 SIGINT equipment in orbit. It was launched aboard of the eighth flight of the Kosmos-2I 63S1 rocket. The launch was conducted from Mayak-2 at Kapustin Yar, and occurred at 05:02:00 GMT on 18 August 1962. It decayed on 17 August 1963, one day short of a year after its launch.

See also

 1962 in spaceflight

References

Spacecraft launched in 1962
Kosmos 0008
1962 in the Soviet Union
Spacecraft which reentered in 1963
Dnepropetrovsk Sputnik program